Wladimiro Calarese (3 October 1930 – 13 August 2005) was an Italian sabre fencer. He won two bronze medals at the 1960 Summer Olympics and two silver medals, at the 1964 and 1968 Summer Olympics.

After retiring from competitions Calarese defended a PhD at New York University and until his death in 2005 lived in the United States. He spent most of his career as a researcher at the Wright-Patterson Air Force Base, but also taught fencing at Wright State University. He was survived by his son Gianguido Calarese, daughter Mia Calarese, sister Wanda Calarese and former wife Barbara Dirr. His another son Gino Calarese died before him. In 2009, an international saber tournament was held in his honor in Palermo, which was attended by world's best saber competitors.

References

1930 births
2005 deaths
Italian male fencers
Olympic fencers of Italy
Fencers at the 1960 Summer Olympics
Fencers at the 1964 Summer Olympics
Fencers at the 1968 Summer Olympics
Olympic silver medalists for Italy
Olympic bronze medalists for Italy
Olympic medalists in fencing
Sportspeople from Messina
Medalists at the 1960 Summer Olympics
Medalists at the 1964 Summer Olympics
Medalists at the 1968 Summer Olympics
Universiade medalists in fencing
Universiade gold medalists for Italy
Medalists at the 1959 Summer Universiade